Tabane  is a village located in Haut-Mbomou Prefecture, Central African Republic.

History 
On 5 March 2016, LRA Achaye's splinter group attacked Tabane. Two people were killed and 12 civilians were kidnapped. Several houses were razed to the ground and the militias also looted civilians' properties. As a result, Tabane residents took refuge in Zemio.

On 19 September 2016, LRA raided Tabane. The raid displaced 700 civilians.

Facility 
Tabane has one health post.

References 

Populated places in Haut-Mbomou